The 2018 Women's European Volleyball League was the 10th edition of the annual Women's European Volleyball League, which features women's national volleyball teams from 20 European countries.

Unlike previous seasons, the tournament had two divisions: the Golden League, featuring twelve teams, and the Silver League, featuring eight teams.

It also acts as the European qualifying competition for the 2018 FIVB Volleyball Women's Challenger Cup, securing two vacancies for the tournament that will then serve as the qualifying competition for the 2019 FIVB Volleyball Women's Nations League.

Pools composition

Golden league

Silver league

Golden league
All times are local.

Pool A

|}

|}

Pool B 

|}

|}

Pool C

|}

|}

Silver league
All times are local.

Pool A

|}

|}

Pool B

|}

|}

Final round
All times are Central European Summer Time (UTC+02:00).

Silver league
Venue:  Rosvalla Nyköping Eventcenter, Nyköping, Sweden

Semifinals

|}

3rd place match

|}

Final

|}

Golden league
Venue:  László Papp Budapest Sports Arena, Budapest, Hungary

Semifinals

|}

3rd place match

|}

Final

|}

Final standing

Awards 

Most Valuable Player
  Mariya Karakasheva
Best Setter
  Lora Kitipova 
Best Outside Spikers
  Gréta Szakmáry
  Michaela Mlejnková

Best Middle Blockers
  Hristina Ruseva
  Laura Pihlajamäki
Best Opposite Spiker
  Silvana Chausheva 
Best Libero
  Rita Molcsányi

See also
2018 Men's European Volleyball League

References

Europe
European Volleyball League
2018 FIVB Volleyball Women's Challenger Cup qualification
2018 in Hungarian women's sport
International volleyball competitions hosted by Hungary
May 2018 sports events in Europe
June 2018 sports events in Europe